Harlequin is a comic servant character.

Harlequin may also refer to:

Arts and entertainment

Fictional characters
 Harlequin (DC Comics), one of several characters in the DC Comics universe
 Harley Quinn (full name: Dr. Harleen Frances Quinzel), a fictional villain in the DC Comics universe
 Mr. Harley Quin, a character by Agatha Christie whom she described as, "a man shown in a harlequin-coloured light"
 The Harlequin, a character in the game Assassin's Creed: Brotherhood
 King (Fairy King Harlequin), a fictional character from The Seven Deadly Sins (2014 TV series)

Music 
 Harlequin (album), an album by Dave Grusin and Lee Ritenour
 Harlequin (band), a Canadian rock group
 "Harlequin", an art rock song by Audience on Audience (album)
 "Harlequin", a progressive rock song by Genesis on Nursery Cryme
 "Harlequin", a pop rock song by The Hollies on 5317704
 "Harlequin", a song by Violet Chachki from her 2015 EP Gagged
 The Harlequins (Dartmouth College), a student music production group

Novels 
 Harlequin (novel), an historical novel by Bernard Cornwell
 The Harlequin (novel), a vampire novel by Laurell K. Hamilton
 Harlequin, a 1994 science fiction Warhammer novel by Ian Watson (author)
 Harlequin, a novel by Morris West

Other uses in arts and entertainment
 Harlequin (film), by Simon Wincer
 Harlequin (video game)
 Harlequin Enterprises, publishing company

Biology 
 Harlequin, a cultivar of Berberis thunbergii, a species of flowering plant in the barberry family
Harlequin beetle
 Harlequin cabbage bug, Murgantia histrionica, a species of stinkbug
 Dindymus versicolor, harlequin bug, a species of cotton stainer bug
 Harlequin duck, Histrionicus histrionicus
 Harlequin ladybird, Harmonia axyridis, a species of beetle
 Harlequin rabbit
 Harlequin tuskfish, Choerodon fasciatus, a species of wrasse
 Hymenocera, "harlequin shrimp", a genus of saltwater shrimp
 Praetaxila segecia, "harlequin metalmark", a butterfly
 Taxila haquinus, "harlequin", a butterfly

Sports

Rugby teams 
 Aberavon Quins RFC, a rugby union club in Wales
 Cardiff Harlequins RFC, a rugby union club in Wales
 Dallas Harlequins, in the United States
 Hamilton Harlequins, in New Zealand
 Harlequin Amateurs, an amateur rugby union club
 Harlequin F.C., a rugby union club in London, England
 Harlequin Ladies Football Club, a women's rugby union club
 Harlequins RL, a rugby league club in England
 Hawick Harlequins RFC, a rugby union club in Scotland
 Hobart Harlequins Rugby Union Club, in Australia
 Kenya Harlequin F.C., in Kenya
 Maesteg Harlequins RFC, a rugby union club in Wales
 Melbourne Harlequins, in Australia
 Ottawa Harlequins, a rugby union club in Canada
 Oxford Harlequins RFC, a rugby union club in England
 Pembroke Dock Harlequins RFC, a rugby union club in Wales
 Pittsburgh Harlequins, a rugby union club in the United States
 Porth Harlequins RFC, a rugby union club in Wales
 Quins-Bobbies Rugby Club, formerly Pretoria Harlequins, in South Africa

Other sports 
 Belfast Harlequins, a multi-sport club in Northern Ireland
 Cork Harlequins, a cricket and hockey club
 Harlequins cricket team, an English former first-class team

Other uses
 , various ships
 Harlequin, Nottinghamshire, England
 Harlequin (color), a color located between green and yellow
 Harlequin Enterprises, a Toronto-based publisher
 Harlequin (software company), a defunct Cambridge, UK technology business

See also 

 
 
 Harlequin syndrome, a distinctive inflammation pattern of the skin caused by nerve injury
 Harlequin-type ichthyosis, a severe and usually fatal skin disease present at birth
 Harley Quinn: Birds of Prey (film) by Cathy Yan, alternative studio title to the 2020 Birds of Prey film
 Harlekin, a 1975 composition for clarinet by Karlheinz Stockhausen
 Arlequin (disambiguation)
 Arlecchino (disambiguation)